¿Quién quiere ser millonario? is the Spanish version of the game show Who Wants to Be a Millionaire? It has aired on Telecinco (1999–2001) and Antena 3 (2005–2009; 2020–present). It has been presented by Carlos Sobera (1999–2008), Antonio Garrido (2009) and Juanra Bonet (2020–present).

Format

Each contestant is asked 15 questions of increasing difficulty for increasing sums of money. Each question is multiple choice, with four options, and each must be answered correctly for the contestant to be asked the next one. The fifteen questions are divided into three blocks of five, ending with the jackpot. Advancing into the next block secures a sum of money. If a wrong answer is given, the contestant leaves with the last secured amount of money.

The contestant has three "lifelines" that they can use once each in the game. "50:50" eliminates two wrong answers so that only the right answer and a random wrong answer remain, "Ask the Audience" (Preguntar al público) takes a survey of what the studio audience believes to be the answer, and "Phone a Friend" (Llamar a un amigo) allows the contestant to make a 30-second telephone call to ask a friend the question.

History

Debut on Telecinco (1999–2001)

Under the original title of 50 por 15: ¿Quiere ser millonario? ("50 for 15: Do you want to be a Millionaire?", referring to the 15 questions and jackpot of 50 million Spanish pesetas), the show debuted on 17 September 1999 at 9 pm. It was presented by Carlos Sobera on Telecinco. This initial spell saw the show's only jackpot winner, Enrique Chicote of Barcelona, who won the sum roughly equal to €300,000. On the final question, he used the Phone a Friend lifeline to call his wife to inform her that he knew the final answer, namely that copra comes from a coconut. The show was cancelled in March 2001 to dedicate more time to Gran Hermano, an adaptation of another popular international format, Big Brother. 50 por 15'''s audience share had peaked at around 29%.

Revival on Antena 3 (2005–2009)
The show was revived under its current name in July 2005, on Antena 3. Sobera returned as the host. With the discontinuation of the peseta, the prize was now €1,000,000. The show was commissioned as a temporary replacement, to fill a timeslot during a break on Pasapalabra, a game show then holding a 22% audience share. An innovation allowed for viewers to win up to €1,000 if they texted the right answer to a question that a contestant did not answer correctly. Sobera said that the revived show would be more fun and less rigid than the Telecinco edition.

In February 2007, the show was renewed for 2008, having achieved average audience shares of 20% and trailing only La Ruleta de la Suerte'' as Antena 3's most-watched show. After a break of 12 months, the show returned in May 2009 with the actor Antonio Garrido as the host.

Second revival (2020–)
In May 2019, Antena 3 announced that Juanra Bonet would host four special episodes to mark the show's 20th anniversary. On the third of these, noted game show winners took part, including Chicote; he won just €15,000 after taking a risk by reserving his Phone a Friend option. Garrido also returned, as a celebrity contestant in March 2021.

References

1999 Spanish television series debuts
2001 Spanish television series endings
2005 Spanish television series debuts
2009 Spanish television series endings
2020 Spanish television series debuts
Telecinco original programming
Antena 3 (Spanish TV channel) original programming
Spanish game shows
Who Wants to Be a Millionaire?